Kari Dziedzic (born 1962) is a Minnesota politician, and the Majority Leader of the Minnesota Senate. A member of the Minnesota Democratic–Farmer–Labor Party (DFL), she represents District 60, which includes portions of the city of Minneapolis in Hennepin County. Her district is also notable for including part of the University of Minnesota. In 2022, she was selected by her caucus to serve as Senate Majority Leader for the 93rd Minnesota Legislature. She previously served as executive assistant to U.S. Senator Paul Wellstone.

Early life, education, and career
Dziedzic is the daughter of Walt Dziedzic, a longtime Minneapolis City Council member, Minneapolis Park Board member, and police inspector. Her brother is retired NHL player Joe Dziedzic. She attended Edison High School in Minneapolis, and received a degree in mechanical engineering from the University of Minnesota.

Dziedzic entered politics as an aide to U.S. Senator Paul Wellstone. Afterward, she worked for Hennepin County, first as communications director for the Hennepin County Attorney, then as a policy aide for County Commissioner Mark Stenglein.

In the private sector, Dziedzic was an executive assistant to Minnesota North Stars owner Norm Green. She filed a sexual harassment lawsuit against him in 1993, which was settled out of court.

Minnesota Senate
Dziedzic was elected in a special election on January 10, 2012, and reelected in November 2012. She succeeded former Minnesota Senate Majority Leader Larry Pogemiller, who had resigned to take a position in the administration of Governor Mark Dayton. Dziedzic was reelected in 2016, 2020, and 2022.

After the DFL retook the Senate majority in the 2022 Minnesota Senate election, Dziedzic was selected to serve as majority leader.

References

External links

Senator Kari Dziedzic official Minnesota Senate website
Senator Kari Dziedzic official campaign website

|-

1962 births
21st-century American politicians
21st-century American women politicians
Democratic Party Minnesota state senators
Edison High School (Minnesota) alumni
Living people
Politicians from Minneapolis
University of Minnesota College of Science and Engineering alumni
Women state legislators in Minnesota